Batztoutai with Memorial Gadgets is a double album by the Japanese noise musician Merzbow. It was later remixed and reissued in 1993 as Batztoutai with Material Gadgets: De-Composed Works 1985~86.

Background
The album is named after – and the title track samples – , a Japanese military march composed by Charles Edouard Gabriel Leroux. Illustrations of the brigade are depicted on the cover, along with the Imperial Seal of Japan.

Some of the album's theme and titles were inspired by the botanist Tanaka Yoshio, who was Masami Akita's maternal great-grandfather. Tanaka founded the Ueno Zoo, hence the zoological titles. The track  refers to the institute where Tanaka was employed.

In an interview with Arthur Potter, Masami Akita explains how this LP and Antimonument were inspired by his native culture:

Akita then explains how the sound of his music changed over time, saying that Batztoutai "uses lots of loops and cut-up sounds from other records".

Recordings
The album samples many electroacoustic / modern classical works by artists including François Bayle, Conlon Nancarrow, Ivo Malec, and Luc Ferrari. "Junk Dahkini" samples the Rendlesham UFO tape, also used on Pornoise/1kg.

Full-length versions of "Anus Anvil Anxiety", "Mortegage", and "Batztoutai" were later released in the Merzbox, along with an unreleased track from the sessions. Alternate mixes and outtakes were release in 2019 on the albums Batztoutai Mix and Jinrinkinmouzui.

The tracks "Semykyoku", "Anus Anvil Anxiety" and "Mortegage" from the original release are missing from the remix. "Intermission" is a short excerpt of "Dahkini Disko" from the original.

The material on Loop Panic Limited is primarily taken from the then-unreleased Agni Hotra. "Industrial Pollusion 2" is a version of "3 Types of Industrial Pollusion", included on the reissue of Antimonument. The album title might be a reference to the underground publisher Loompanics Unlimited.

The track "Fireploof Enema 1" was used on Russell Haswell's track "Micromedley" on the Merzbow remix album Scumtron.

Reception
In 2003, Matmos included the album in a list of the best musique concrète albums; they said: "What Coldcut's Journey by DJs set is to the hip-hop mixtape, this baby is to musique concrète: a double exposure of elaborately detourned and fricasseed material which was already quite tricked out in the first place."

Track listing

LP

CD

Personnel
Masami Akita – performer
Ron Lessard – song selection
Ad Suprex – artworks, design
Maggie Whaley – visual interpretation for production

References

1986 albums
Merzbow albums
Musique concrète albums